Patrick Couture (born May 28, 1978) is a Canadian former professional ice hockey goaltender.

Prior to turning professional,  Couture played major junior hockey in the Quebec Major Junior Hockey League. Couture set the QMJHL's record, and still holds the Quebec Remparts' team record, for posting a goals against average (GAA) of just 1.85 during the 1997–98 QMJHL season.

Awards and honours

References

External links
 
 

1978 births
Living people
Adirondack IceHawks players
Beauport Harfangs players
Canadian ice hockey goaltenders
Columbia Inferno players
El Paso Buzzards players
Essen Mosquitoes players
Fort Worth Brahmas players
Phoenix Mustangs players
Pont Rouge Lois Jeans players
Quebec Citadelles players
Quebec Remparts players
Rouyn-Noranda Huskies players
San Diego Gulls (WCHL) players
Thetford Mines Isothermic players
Val-d'Or Foreurs players
Ice hockey people from Quebec City
Canadian expatriate ice hockey players in Germany